Nikhil Suresh Advani (born 28 April 1971) is an Indian director, screenwriter and producer who works in Hindi cinema. He along with his sister, Monisha Advani and Madhu Bhojwani, co-founded the entertainment company Emmay Entertainment.

Early life and family
Advani was born and raised in Bombay, Maharashtra, India, into a Sindhi Hindu family. His father is a retired professional who worked in senior management positions with multinationals in the chemical and pharmaceuticals industry and his mother is an advertising professional. His father is Sindhi and mother Maharashtrian.

He studied at Green Lawns High School, Breach Candy, and later did his Masters in chemistry at St. Xavier's College, Mumbai. He married his college friend Suparna Gupta with whom he has a daughter Keya. Advani is the grand nephew of late producer N. N. Sippy and second cousin of actor Tusshar Kapoor and producer Ekta Kapoor.

His wife, Suparna Gupta is a child rights activist. Winner of the Ashoka Fellowship For Leading Social Entrepreneurship (2009) she graduated as an Edward S. Mason Fellow from Harvard Kennedy School of Government (2012) and co-founded a non-profit organization, Aangan which works on child trafficking, child marriage, and child labor.

Film career
Nikkhil’s film career spans over twenty five years. He began assisting art-house film directors, Saeed Mirza, Kundan Shah, and Sudhir Mishra. Subsequently, he worked under Dharma Productions, the production house of the late Yash Johar, father of Karan Johar and Yash Raj Films.

Advani started his career by assisting Saeed and Aziz Mirza in directing Naya Nukkad (1994), and his very first outing as a co-screenplay writer for Iss Raat Ki Subah Nahin (1996) was critically appreciated. Then, he was an assistant director and assisted Karan Johar in his first two directorial projects, Kuch Kuch Hota Hai (1998) and Kabhi Khushi Kabhi Gham (2001). Advani also had an acting guest appearance in Kuch Kuch Hota Hai, along with Farah Khan during the Neelam Show sequence. Similarly, he assisted Aditya Chopra on Mohabbatein (2000).

Advani made his directorial debut with the critically acclaimed film Kal Ho Naa Ho (2003), is a romantic comedy-drama film starring Jaya Bachchan, Shah Rukh Khan, Saif Ali Khan, and Preity Zinta, with Sushma Seth, Reema Lagoo, Lillete Dubey, and Delnaaz Paul in supporting roles. The film received positive critical feedback and was commercially successful, and was the highest-grossing Indian film of the year. It explores several themes, such as the depiction of non-resident Indians, inter-caste marriage, terminal illness, and homosexuality through innuendo and homosocial bonding. It won two National Film Awards, eight Filmfare Awards, thirteen International Indian Film Academy Awards, six Producers Guild Film Awards, three Screen Awards, and two Zee Cine Awards in 2004.

Advani directed and co-wrote the screenplay for Salaam-e-Ishq (2007) an Indian romantic drama film directed by Nikkhil Advani, it featured an ensemble cast of Salman Khan, Priyanka Chopra, Anil Kapoor, Juhi Chawla, Akshaye Khanna, Ayesha Takia, John Abraham, Vidya Balan, Govinda, Shannon Esra, Sohail Khan and Isha Koppikar in lead roles. The film weaves 6 love stories together thanks to the relationships of the people within it. The film was Advani's second directorial venture after Kal Ho Naa Ho (2003) and the unofficial remake of Hollywood film Love Actually (2003).

In 2009, Advani directed Chandni Chowk to China, an action comedy film that stars Akshay Kumar and Deepika Padukone in the lead roles with Mithun Chakraborty and Hong Kong action cinema actor Gordon Liu. The film revolves around a vegetable cutter from Chandni Chowk in Delhi who finds himself on an adventure in China after the residents of an oppressed village deem him to be the reincarnation of a slain Chinese revolutionary. The film was distributed in the U.S. and co-produced by Warner Bros. It is Warner Bros. Pictures first Hindi film. Released on 16 January 2009, it was the third highest-grossing film of the year at the Indian Box Office.

Following this Advani produced Jaane Kahan Se Aayi Hai (2010), a Bollywood science fiction romance film directed by Milap Zaveri. It stars Riteish Deshmukh, Jacqueline Fernandez, Sonal Sehgal, and Ruslaan Mumtaz in lead roles.

In 2006, Nikkhil directed and wrote the story and screenplay Patiala House (2011) starring Rishi Kapoor, Dimple Kapadia, Akshay Kumar and Anushka Sharma in the title roles.

Nikkhil Advani is a National Award-winning filmmaker whose children's film Delhi Safari (2012) was India's first 3-D Stereoscopic animation feature. It advocated for wildlife conservation and is currently being developed into a full-fledged franchise in Hollywood.

After this release, Nikkhil Advani partnered with Monisha Advani and Madhu Bhojwani to form Emmay Entertainment, a motion picture production company. The first feature film produced by Emmay Entertainment was D-Day (2013), a film directed by Nikkhil, in association with DAR Motion Pictures, which was released on 19 July 2013, which was received with positive reviews along with a few awards.

Advani's recent directorial work has been produced under the Emmay Entertainment banner, founded by Monisha Advani, Madhu Bhojwani, and himself. The production house is one of Mumbai’s leading production companies creating innovative and edgy content for both feature films and Web and is currently working with Disney, Fox Star India, Netflix, Amazon Prime, and Sony.

Headlined by Emmay Entertainment, the production house released films like Airlift (2016), starring Akshay Kumar and Nimrat Kaur, based on true-life events of the evacuation of 170,000 Indians from Kuwait during the first Gulf War. Airlift is produced by T-Series, Cape of Good, Emmay Entertainment, and Abundantia Entertainment. The film was their first to cross 1 billion on the box office and also their first to receive a National Award.

Advani then teamed up with Siddharth Roy Kapur under the banner of UTV Motion Pictures to produce & direct Katti Batti (2015) a romantic comedy-drama film starring Imran Khan and Kangana Ranaut in the lead roles. For his next film, Advani directed Hero (2015) a romantic action film co-written by Umesh Bist and himself, a remake of Subhash Ghai's 1983 blockbuster film of the same name. The film starred debutantes Sooraj Pancholi and Athiya Shetty,

Advani’s latest release was Batla House (2019), an action thriller film written by Ritesh Shah. Inspired by the Batla House encounter case that took place on 19 September 2008, the film stars John Abraham as a police officer named Sanjeev Kumar Yadav, the film follows who played a crucial role in the encounter. The story showcases the encounter and in its aftermath, Sanjeev's struggle to catch the fugitives and prove the encounter wasn't a fake one while dealing with nationwide hatred and post traumatic stress disorder. The film was theatrically released in India on 15 August 2019 during Independence Day weekend. It became commercially successful at the box office.

In addition to his directorial work, he has produced several films by other directors under the Emmay banner. Like Airlift (2016), Lucknow Central (2017), Satyameva Jayate (2018), Baazaar (2018), Marjaavaan (2019), Indoo Ki Jawani (2020), Bell Bottom (2021), Satyameva Jayate 2 (2021).

Other ventures

Web series

Advani has produced & co-written his first digital venture, Hasmukh (2020). This is a Netflix Original series directed by Nikhil Gonsalves and written by Suparn Verma, Vir Das, Nikkhil Advani, Amogh Ranadive & Neeraj Pandey. Headlined by Vir Das as ‘Hasmukh’ and Ranvir Shorey as ‘Jimmy’ the show's cast also consists of Amrita Bagchi, Mantra, Ravi Kishan, Manoj Pahwa, Joanna Robaczewska, Raza Murad, among others. Emmay Entertainment as the production house has created this show in association with Applause Entertainment.

On 26 November 2020, Advani released the teaser to his upcoming web series. This will be an Amazon original series titled Mumbai Diaries 26/11 based on the 2008 Mumbai terrorist attacks. The Series is directed by Nikkhil Advani and Nikhil Gonsalves and will star Mohit Raina, Tina Desai alongside Konkona Sen Sharma. It was set for release in March 2021.

Short films
Emmay produced the short film, Guddu Engineer (2016) for the Zeal for Unity in 2016. Targeted at Indo-Pak unity, it was based on Rumi’s poem, "Your task is not to seek for love, but merely to seek and find all the barriers within yourself that you have built against it". Directed by Nikkhil Advani, Guddu Engineer it won awards at the 5th Mumbai Shorts International Film Festival.

Amazon Prime Video unveiled Unpaused – Apartment (2020), an anthology of five Hindi short films filmed during the pandemic and featuring stories about new beginnings. Amongst which one such short film is Apartment directed by Nikkhil Advani, starring Richa Chadha, Sumeet Vyas, and Ishwak Singh. The plot focuses on the fall and ultimate rise of Chadha's character as she comes to terms with her husband's indiscretions with the help of a friendly neighbor.

Television
A TV Film called Shaadi Vaadi And All That, an hour-long film for MTV, produced by Nikkhil Advani is a love triangle with a twist. The show is Kaashvi Nair's directorial debut who worked with Nikkhil as an assistant director.

Nikkhil Advani has directed a finite TV Series P.O.W.- Bandi Yuddh Ke for Star Plus. The show is an official adaption of an Israeli TV series Hatufim. The series was premiered on 7 November 2016. Several Bollywood celebrities have praised the trailer. The show was premiered at the MAMI film fest followed by a talk with Gideon Raff.

Non-film work 
In his spare time, Advani enjoys working with Bittu Sahgal and is a member of the Board of Sanctuary Nature Foundation, which advocates climate change, biodiversity, nature conservation and save the tiger's cause. He is also actively involved in the restoration of Classic Films working along with Shiven Dungarpur and the Film Heritage Foundation. He also collaborates with Srila Chaterjee and Mahesh Mathai, curating the art house cinema for Baro Film Night. An avid Soccer fan, he works with Sarah White, Head of Partnership Marketing – APAC, City Football Marketing, to advocate and promote Manchester City Football Club in Mumbai.

Filmography

Films

Television

Other credits

Assistant director
 Is Raat Ki Subah Nahin (1996)
 Kuch Kuch Hota Hai (1998)
 Mohabbatein (2000)
 Kabhi Khushi Kabhi Gham (2001)

Actor

References

External links 

 
 

1971 births
Living people
21st-century Indian film directors
Hindi-language film directors
Sindhi people
St. Xavier's College, Mumbai alumni
Film directors from Mumbai
Indian male screenwriters
Hindi film producers
Film producers from Mumbai